Star Wars: The Bad Batch is an American animated series created by Dave Filoni for the streaming service Disney+. It is part of the Star Wars franchise, acting as both a sequel to, and spin-off from, the series Star Wars: The Clone Wars. The Bad Batch is produced by Lucasfilm Animation, with Jennifer Corbett as head writer and Brad Rau as supervising director.

Dee Bradley Baker voices the members of the Bad Batch, a squad of elite clone troopers with genetic mutations. He also voices other clones in the series, reprising his role from The Clone Wars. Michelle Ang stars as Omega, a female clone who joins the squad. The series was officially ordered by Disney+ in July 2020 as a spin-off from The Clone Wars, with Filoni, Corbett, and Rau attached.

The first season of Star Wars: The Bad Batch premiered on May 4, 2021, and ran for 16 episodes until August 13. It received positive reviews from critics. A second season, also consisting of 16 episodes, premiered on January 4, 2023 and will conclude on March 29.

Premise 
Clone Force 99, also known as the Bad Batch—a group of elite clone troopers with genetic mutations that were first introduced in Star Wars: The Clone Wars—take on daring mercenary missions in the aftermath of the Clone Wars. Unlike the majority of the clone army, most of the Bad Batch is able to resist the influence of Order 66, which turned their brethren into brutal and blindly obedient slaves of Emperor Palpatine.  In doing so, they become fugitives of the Galactic Empire in its earliest days, while Grand Moff Tarkin begins phasing out the use of clones in favor of regular humans as the Stormtroopers.

Cast and characters

Starring 

 Dee Bradley Baker as all members of the Bad Batch:A squad of elite clone troopers also known as Clone Force 99, consisting of Hunter, Wrecker, Tech, Crosshair, and Echo. Star Wars creator George Lucas wanted the Bad Batch to be more unique than other clones, with each having special abilities, but he did not want them to be superheroes. Baker also voices the other clones in the series, including Cut Lawquane, Captains Rex, Howzer, Gregor and Wilco, Commander Cody, and clone commando Scorch.
 Michelle Ang as Omega:A young female clone  working as a medical assistant on Kamino. She is an unmodified replication of Jango Fett, but is genetically deviant from standard clone templates and therefore feels a kind of kinship with the Bad Batch.

Recurring 
 Ben Diskin as AZI-3: A medical droid on Kamino.
 Bob Bergen as Lama Su: The prime minister of Kamino.
 Gwendoline Yeo as Nala Se: The Kaminoan scientist in charge of the cloning process.

* Noshir Dalal as Vice Admiral Rampart: An Imperial officer responsible for the new chain code registration system and Imperial army recruitments.

 Dahéli Hall as ES-04: An Imperial Elite Squad Trooper.

 Rhea Perlman as Ciddarin "Cid" Scaleback: A Trandoshan and former Jedi informant who provides mercenary work to the Bad Batch.
 Liam O'Brien as Bolo: An Ithorian regular at Cid's parlor.
 Sam Riegel as Ketch: A Weequay regular at Cid's parlor.

 Tina Huang as ES-02: An Imperial Elite Squad Trooper.
 Ness Bautista as ES-03: An Imperial Elite Squad Trooper.

Guests

Introduced in season one 
 Archie Panjabi as Depa Billaba, the Jedi Master of Caleb Dume.
 Matthew Wood as battle droids and Bib Fortuna, Jabba's majordomo and right hand.
 Freddie Prinze Jr. as Caleb Dume, the Padawan of Depa Billaba, who escapes Order 66 on Kaller. Prinze previously voiced an older version of the character in Star Wars Rebels
 Ian McDiarmid as Emperor Palpatine / Darth Sidious, the Emperor of the Galactic Empire, as well as the Dark Lord of the Sith.
 Tom Kane as the narrator
 Andrew Kishino as Saw Gerrera, a freedom fighter with ties to the Rebel Alliance.
 Stephen Stanton as Admiral Tarkin, a high-ranking Imperial officer. Stanton also voices Mas Amedda, the Grand Vizier, second in command to Palpatine.
 Nika Futterman as Shaeeah Lawquane, the daughter of Cut Lawquane and his wife, Suu.
 Kath Soucie as Jek Lawquane, The son of Cut Lawquane and his wife, Suu.
 Cara Pifko as Suu Lawquane, the wife of Cut Lawquane.
 Emilio Garcia-Sanchez as ES-01, an Imperial Elite Squad Trooper.
 Ming-Na Wen as Fennec Shand, an elite mercenary and sniper hired by the Kaminoans to retrieve Omega from the Bad Batch.
 Brigitte Kali as Trace Martez, an ex-smuggler turned freedom fighter and Rafa's younger sister.
 Elizabeth Rodriguez as Rafa Martez, an ex-smuggler turned freedom fighter and Trace's older sister.
 Corey Burton as Cad Bane, an infamous bounty hunter hired to retrieve Omega. Burton also voices Gobi Glie, Hera's uncle and Cham Syndulla's subordinate.
 Seth Green as Todo 360, a service droid owned by Bane.
 Rena Owen as Taun We: Lama Su's aide.

 Alexander Siddig as Avi Singh, a senator from the former Separatist planet of Raxus Secundus.
 Sian Clifford as GS-8, Avi Singh's protocol droid.
 Shelby Young as Captain Bragg, an Imperial officer on Raxus Secundus. Young also voices Yanna, a Wookie elder, and Lenk.
 Vanessa Marshall as Hera Syndulla, Cham Syndulla's daughter, an aspiring pilot and freedom fighter. Marshall, who also voiced an older version of the character in Rebels, used a French accent for the younger Hera to match the native Rylothian Twi'lek accents heard from other characters.
 Robin Atkin Downes as Cham Syndulla, a famed Twi'lek freedom fighter and Hera's father.
 Ferelith Young as Eleni Syndulla, Cham Syndulla's wife and Hera's mother.
 Phil LaMarr as Orn Free Taa, the corrupt Imperial senator of Ryloth. LaMarr also voices Bail Organa, a senator from Alderaan.
 Chopper as "Himself", Hera's irritable astromech droid.

 Tom Taylorson as Roland Durand, a Devaronian crime boss.
 Helen Sadler as Doctor Scalder, an Imperial scientist involved in the secret Imperial cloning operation.

Introduced in season two 
 Wanda Sykes as Phee Genoa, a pirate who has contracts with Cid.
 Héctor Elizondo as Romar Adell, a local of Serenno who went into hiding after the Empire bombarded the planet.
 Tasia Valenza as Tawni Ames, the Separatist governor of Desix, who opposes the Empire's occupation.
 Max Mittelman as Governor Grotton, an Imperial governor installed on Desix.
 Ben Schwartz as TAY-0, a droid who participates in races for Cid.
 Ernie Hudson as Grini Millegi, a Dowutin gangster who was an associate of Cid and oversees Riot Racing on the planet Safa Toma. 
 Jonathan Lipow as Gungi, a Wookiee Jedi youngling on the run from the Empire, and Mokko, a slaver and boss of a scavenging gang
 JP Karliak as Venomor, a Trandoshan mercenary leader, who works for the Empire.
 Jennifer Hale as Riyo Chuchi, a Pantoran member of the Imperial Senate. 
 Sharon Duncan Brewster as Tynnra Pamlo, a senator from Taris and member of the Imperial Senate. 

 Jameelah McMillan as Halle Burtoni, a Kaminoan and former member of the Imperial Senate. 

Yuri Lowenthal as Benni Baro, a teenage scavenger and ipsium miner.
Aleks Le as Drake, a human scavenger and member of Mokko's inner circle.
Jimmi Simpson as Doctor Royce Hemlock, the scientific director of the secret Imperial cloning facility on Mount Tantiss.
Keisha Castle-Hughes as Emerie Karr, the Imperial administrator of the Mount Tantiss facility.
Crispin Freeman as Lieutenant Nolan, an Imperial lieutenant with particular disdain for clones, the commanding officer of Crosshair.
 Imari Williams as Shep Hazard, mayor of Pabu, father of Lyana, and good friend of Phee Genoa.
 Andy Allo as Lyana Hazard, Shep's daughter who becomes friends with Omega.

Episodes

Season 1 (2021)

Season 2 (2023)

Production

Background 
By September 2016, Star Wars: The Clone Wars and Star Wars Rebels supervising director Dave Filoni had stepped back from that position on the latter series so he could focus more on the series' writing as well as the development of future animated series for Lucasfilm. In July 2018, Filoni announced that a final season of The Clone Wars would be released on the streaming service Disney+ in 2020. The season includes a four episode arc introducing a squad of clone troopers with genetic mutations known as the Bad Batch; the episodes previously existed as story reels for an earlier, unfinished season of the series, and came directly from the plans of Star Wars creator George Lucas.

Development 
Disney+ officially ordered a new series from Lucasfilm Animation in July 2020 titled Star Wars: The Bad Batch, a spin-off from the final season of The Clone Wars following the Bad Batch clones in the aftermath of the Clone War. The announcement described the series as Dave Filoni's vision, and he serves as executive producer alongside Lucasfilm's Athena Portillo, supervising director Brad Rau, and head writer Jennifer Corbett, with Lucasfilm's Carrie Beck and Josh Rimes as co-executive producer and producer, respectively. Filoni described the series as "very much in the vein" of The Clone Wars and said it would stay true to Lucas's vision for that series of telling epic, exciting adventure stories. In August 2021, before the release of the two-part first-season finale, the series was officially renewed for a second season.

Casting 

The first trailer for the series, which released in December 2020, confirmed that Dee Bradley Baker would return from The Clone Wars as the voice of all the clone troopers in the series, including the members of the Bad Batch and Captain Rex. It also revealed that a younger version of the character Fennec Shand from The Mandalorian would be appearing in the series, and actress Ming-Na Wen soon confirmed that she would reprise her role as Shand. Additionally, Stephen Stanton and Andrew Kishino reprised their roles as Admiral Tarkin and Saw Gerrera, respectively.

Music 
Kevin Kiner was confirmed to be scoring the series in January 2021, after previously scoring The Clone Wars and Rebels. He wrote the Bad Batch Theme for the final season of The Clone Wars, and described his score for The Bad Batch as an evolution from its predecessor with a mix of electronic and orchestral elements. Kiner was inspired by the soundtracks of The Guns of Navarone (1961) and The Dirty Dozen (1967), which both feature a band of characters similar to The Bad Batch.

Kiner's score for the first season was released digitally by Walt Disney Records in two volumes: music from the first eight episodes was released on June 25, 2021, and music from the last eight episodes was released on August 20. A track from the first season, titled "Enter the Bad Batch", was released digitally as a single on May 13.

A third volume, featuring music from the first eight episodes of the second season of The Bad Batch, was released digitally on February 17, 2023. A fourth volume, featuring additional selections of music from the second season, is also expected to be released in the following weeks.

Marketing 
Lucasfilm president Kathleen Kennedy promoted the series at Disney's Investor Day event on December 10, 2020, revealing the first trailer for the series. Jacob Oller of Syfy Wire felt the trailer made the series look like a more action-heavy version of The Clone Wars, and compared it to the 1980s television series The A-Team. Ahead of the series premiere, characters from the series were also added to the mobile role-playing game Star Wars: Galaxy of Heroes as unlockable, playable characters.

Release 
Star Wars: The Bad Batch premiered on Disney+ on May 4, 2021, Star Wars Day, with a special 70-minute episode. The second episode was released on May 7, and subsequent episodes were released weekly for a total of 16 episodes. The second season premiered on January 4, 2023, with two episodes, followed by weekly releases for the rest of the 16-episode season, with the seventh and eighth episodes releasing together on February 8, and the fifteenth and sixteenth episodes releasing together on March 29, 2023, concluding the season. The second season was previously expected to premiere on September 28, 2022.

Reception

Audience viewership 
According to Whip Media's viewership tracking app TV Time, Star Wars: The Bad Batch was the most anticipated new television series, during the month of May 2021, and was the 4th most anticipated returning television series, during the month of September 2022. According to Nielsen, Star Wars: The Bad Batch was the 7th most streamed original series across all platforms, during the week of May 3, 2021 to May 9, 2021.

According to Whip Media's viewership tracking app TV Time, Star Wars: The Bad Batch was the 3rd most streamed original series across all platforms during the week of January 8, 2023, the 3rd during the week of January 15, 2023, the 3rd during the week of January 22, 2023, the 3rd during the week of January 29, 2023, the 3rd during the week of February 5, 2023, the 5th during the week of February 12, 2023, the 5th during the week of February 19, 2023, the 6th during the week of February 26, 2023, the 7th during the week of March 5, 2023, and the 6th during the week of March 12, 2023.

Critical response 
The review aggregator website Rotten Tomatoes reported an 86% approval rating with an average rating of 7.3/10, based on 92 reviews for the first season. The website's critics consensus reads, "The Bad Batch beautifully animated adventure may be too lore heavy for casual viewers, but fans will enjoy diving deeper into this dastardly cast of characters." Metacritic, which uses a weighted average, assigned a score of 67 out of 100 based on 9 critics, indicating "generally favorable reviews." The second season has an approval rating of 88% with an average rating of 7/10 based on 16 reviews, the website's critic consensus states: "The second bundle of The Bad Batch retains all the same virtues and vices as the first: a slick Star Wars adventure geared toward diehard fans at the expense of more casual viewers."

Joel Keller of Decider called the series a "worthy" spinoff of Star Wars: The Clone Wars and praised the introduction of Omega as a female main character, writing, "Star Wars: The Bad Batch should satisfy Clone Wars fans and give completist fans of the franchise a chance to see what happened at the very beginning of the Empire." Joshua Rivera of Polygon gave the show a positive review and stated, "The prequels are just as full of rich potential as the original Star Wars trilogy, and The Bad Batch, like The Clone Wars before it, is set to do a lot of slow, careful work to tease out that potential." Wenlei Ma of News.com.au gave the show a positive review and stated, "The Bad Batch is catnip for the dedicated Star Wars fans. It's an animated action-adventure series with thrills, relatable characters on the right side of the war, blaster guns and enough lore and easter eggs to invoke a few excited squeals."

Vincent Schilling of Indian Country Today gave the show 8.5 out of 10 stars and stated, "I'm not a superfan of Star Wars animated series, but I am impressed with this one, a team of certifiable rejects, each with their own skillset, is a winning formula for me - excellent actually." Jesse Schdeen of IGN gave the premiere episode an 8 out of 10 rating, stating that the series is "a worthy successor to The Clone Wars, so much so that it could easily be rebranded as an eighth season" and that "it uses a loose end from that show to build a brand new story about the plight of clones after the war's end, and it's one that immediately resonates". He also added that the show "captures a lot of what made The Clone Wars so great (including the slick animation style and the vocal talents of Baker), but it doesn't entirely escape that show's flaws, either". Julian Lytle of idobi.com gave the show 8 out of 10 stars and stated, "The Bad Batch feels familiar but also starts a new journey with new characters in a cool setting. I can't wait to see what happens with this group in the Empire." Marty Brown of Common Sense Media gave the show 4 out of 5 stars and a '10+' age rating, stating, "This series delivers on precisely what fans would expect from a Star Wars story: world building, unique new characters, and big action sequences with a moral allegory at the center."

Jonathan Roberts of The New Paper gave the show 2.5 out of 5 stars and stated, "The Bad Batch is good to dip into, but it can make for a bad binge." Niv M. Sultan of Slant Magazine rated the series 1.5 out of 4 stars and stated, "The show's attempt to individualize its protagonists largely reduces them to predictable, banal archetypes."

Accolades 
The first season is one of 200 television series that received the ReFrame Stamp for the years 2021 to 2022. The stamp is awarded by the gender equity coalition ReFrame and industry database IMDbPro for film and television projects that are proven to have gender-balanced hiring, with stamps being awarded to projects that hire female-identifying people, especially women of color, in four out of eight key roles for their production.

The series was nominated for Outstanding Achievement in Sound Editing – Animation Series or Short at the 2022 Motion Picture Sound Editors Awards. It won Best Animated Series at the 47th Saturn Awards.

Notes

References

External links
 
 
 

 
2020s American animated television series
2020s American science fiction television series
2021 American television series debuts
American animated action television series
American animated science fiction television series
American computer-animated television series
American television spin-offs
Animated television series about extraterrestrial life
Disney+ original programming
Fictional mercenaries
Interquel television series
Bad Batch
Animated television shows based on films
Television series by Lucasfilm